Vaudeville was a theatrical genre of variety entertainment in the United States and Canada from the early 1880s until the early 1930s.

Vaudeville may also refer to:

Arts and entertainment
 Vaudeville (song), a type of 17th- and 18th-century French satirical poem 
 Vaudeville (album), a 2010 album by D-Sisive
 Vaudeville Theatre, a London theatre

Places
 Vaudeville, Meurthe-et-Moselle, a commune in the Meurthe-et-Moselle department, France
 Vaudéville, a village and commune in the Vosges département, France

See also
 Comédie en vaudevilles, a theatrical entertainment which began in Paris towards the end of the 17th century